TMI Episcopal is a private school in San Antonio. Previously known as Texas Military Institute, TMI is a  selective coeducational Episcopal college preparatory school with a military tradition in San Antonio, Texas for boarding and day students. It is the flagship school, and sole secondary school, of the Episcopal Diocese of West Texas. TMI is the oldest Episcopal college preparatory school in the American Southwest. Founded as West Texas School for Boys, the school was later known as West Texas Military Academy, and popularly nicknamed 'West Point on the Rio Grande', though it is several hours from the Rio Grande itself.

History
TMI was founded in 1893 by the Rt Revd James Steptoe Johnston, DD, Second Bishop of West Texas in the Protestant Episcopal Church.  Johnston was a native Mississippian of the planter class who had participated in twelve engagements in the Civil War. He fought most of these battles with the Eleventh Mississippi Regiment.

Johnston's earliest name for his school in San Antonio was "The West Texas School for Boys," which was quickly changed to "West Texas Military Academy" (WTMA). In 1926, the name was changed to Texas Military Institute.

At the time of the school's foundation, San Antonio lay on the edge of the American frontier, with forts all along the high ground east of the Rio Grande. Though Bishop Johnston wanted his boys to receive as good an education as boys anywhere in America, he knew that a New England-style prep school would not work in West Texas, so he created a premier academic school with a full-fledged military discipline. The specifically Southern boarding school tradition was not often military.

Bishop Johnston saw the need to provide young men with a classical liberal and scientific education that would enable them to go on to careers in business, agriculture and ranching, the Church, the civil service, and the officer corps of the United States Army. He set out to develop "the Christian character amongst the rising generation... for character is the only true wealth."  He assumed that "the best use of wealth is to coin it into character." The quotation shows that WTMA was part of the "church school movement" of the nineteenth century, which featured character formation as the means to personal success in many areas, including academic pursuits.  Hence, WTMA may be counted among other church schools such as Saint James in Maryland (1842), St. Paul's in New Hampshire (1856), Shattuck-Saint Mary's in Minnesota (1858), St. Mark's School (1865) and Groton School (1884), both in Massachusetts, and St. George's School in Rhode Island (1896).

The first rector and headmaster of WTMA/TMI, the Reverend Allan Lucien Burleson, had been prepared at the Shattuck School, founded by J. Lloyd Breck in 1858. Breck was a protege of the great William Augustus Muhlenberg, "father" of the church school in America. Burleson served as the head of school between 1893 and 1900. WTMA was largely funded by donations from wealthy residents of the eastern seaboard, many of whom had been inspired by speeches Johnston had given on the importance of academic and moral education for all young men. When the school first opened, there were just six teachers and twelve students.

One of the great educators in Texas history took over WTMA in 1926. Dr W. W. Bondurant changed the name to "Texas Military Institute." In 1936 Bishop Capers, feeling the pinch created by the Great Depression, sold TMI to Bondurant, who sold the school back to the Episcopal Church in 1952. Back in 1926 Bondurant had merged the Upper School of San Antonio Academy with TMI. Bondurant was a strong Presbyterian layman, yet the chaplain remained an Episcopal priest and the Book of Common Prayer continued to be used in daily chapel services.

By the 1930s, the school was considered by some to be one of the best schools in America.

Although Bishop Johnston had, in part, intended the school to train young men for seminary and eventual ordination in the Episcopal Church, the school has always been open to students of any religious faith or lack thereof.

The JROTC, or Corps of Cadets, has been optional for girls since their admission in 1972, and for boys since 1974.

From 2005 to 2017, the school presented itself by the name of TMI: The Episcopal School of Texas. However, in December 2017 under the new leadership of its 31st headmaster, the Rev. Scott J. Brown, the school decided to change its official title to TMI Episcopal.

Three Presidents of the United States have visited the school. The first was William Taft. The next was John F. Kennedy, who visited on November 21, 1963, the day before his assassination. The most recent was George W. Bush. Future President Theodore Roosevelt also visited when he was in San Antonio recruiting for the Rough Riders.

In the summer of 2009, Katharine Jefferts Schori, the Presiding Bishop of the Episcopal Church, visited the school and gave a speech on the importance of Episcopal schools to the overall mission of the Church.

Campus
TMI has moved three times, each time relocating to the edge of an expanding city. The first campus was on Government Hill, next to Fort Sam Houston; the second was in Alamo Heights; and the current campus, dating from 1989, is in far northwest San Antonio, on the edge of the  Texas Hill Country. The campus is modern in architecture and built almost entirely from local limestone. Features of the campus include:

The Frost Athletic Center is a large gym, incorporating two basketball/volleyball courts, two squash courts, a rifle range and a natatorium with a half-olympic length pool, as well as the school infirmary and  offices for athletic and JROTC staff.
Coates Hall, the main academic building, incorporates most of the classrooms, labs and faculty offices. It is built around two courtyard gardens with open-air hallways. A small greenhouse built alongside Coates hall is used for botany lessons.
The All Saints' Chapel is a 500-seat modern chapel, used for daily service of Morning Prayer and for Eucharistic services on the first Wednesday of every month as well as for quarterly school Evensongs, choral concerts and the annual baccalaureate Mass. The chapel, designed by alumnus Chris Carson of Ford, Powell & Carson, was recognized as one of the best religious buildings of 2009 by the Interfaith Forum on Religion, Art and Architecture, a knowledge community of the American Institute of Architects. The chapel organ is a two manual, 18 voice Schoenstein & Co. opus.
The Johnston Amphitheatre is used for graduation and for some school assemblies during fair weather.
Ayres Hall incorporates administrative offices, a black box theatre, kitchens, refectory, and library, which houses music, archived newspapers and magazines for much of the 20th century, as well as 17,000 books, including a rare books conservation section.
The Butterfly Garden was built and is maintained by the environmental science class.
The Roger Kramer Observatory and Virgil Espino Telescope is used for astronomy classes. 
The Orchard has apple and plum trees.
Houses and Dormitories house boarding students and some residential faculty, while the headmaster, chaplain, school physician and other resident faculty live in detached houses.
Walker Innovation Center is TMI's newest addition to campus. On October 15, 2020 the building opened. The Walker Innovation Center is funded through a Major Gifts Campaign led by Stephen E. Walker, a longtime TMI Board of Governors member, parent of TMI alumni, and TMI grandparent and Mr. Walker and his wife, Debra.

Student life
There are currently around 400 students. Students come mostly from South Texas and Mexico, as well as other areas of the United States, including Michigan and Tennessee, and from foreign countries, including Afghanistan, Australia, China, Colombia, Hong Kong, Nigeria, Russia, South Korea, Thailand and Vietnam.

Honor code
TMI had an informal honor system from the beginning, with the current formal system originating in 1908. All students sign their name to the school's honor code at the start of each term, and from then on write the word "pledge" on all their tests and papers, signifying their pledge to uphold their promise. The honor code reads, "Because I believe integrity is essential, I promise not to lie, cheat, or steal." Students suspected of being in violation of the honor code are sent before the Honor Council, an elected body of students that holds confidential hearings and, where appropriate, assigns disciplinary measures, including community service. It can also require that the student write a letter of apology. Repeat offenders may be referred to the headmaster.

Traditions
Like most prep schools, TMI has developed a not insubstantial canon of traditions and idiosyncrasies. These include:

Chapel Talks: Every final year student must give a speech on a moral or spiritual topic before the entire student body, faculty and administrative staff during a daily chapel service. These talks are diverse and may be based upon personal experience or reading, but must promote positive ethical values. Although conducted within the context of a chapel service, such talks need not be, and usually are not, on explicitly religious subjects. Final year students prepare their speeches under the guidance of the English faculty and are graded by a faculty panel. A passing grade is required to graduate, although in practice, all students who stick to a previously approved message are given passing grades. Members of the faculty also occasionally give their own chapel talks. The Burleson Prize, named after the school's first headmaster, is given every year for the best student chapel talk.
Daunt Lectures: Named for the Reverend Canon Nelson Daunt, a former headmaster, the annual Daunt Lectures in Church and Society explore the religious dimensions of contemporary moral, social and public issues. Speakers come from diverse religious backgrounds, and the invitation to speak at the school does not imply an endorsement of the speaker's views. Previous speakers have included Peter Kreeft, as well as members of the theology and philosophy faculties of universities from around Texas and the United States.
Founder's Day: Every year, students have one day off of class in commemoration and celebration of the school's founder, Bishop James Steptoe Johnston. Part of the day is dedicated to speeches, but the majority of it is spent in a school wide competition in which teams of costumed students from various years, led by those in their final year, compete in a series of tasks of varying levels of farcicality.
Homecoming Tailgate Party: The annual homecoming tailgate party, which always features local Kiolbassa Sausage, was covered by the Food Network show Unwrapped in 2008.
Military Ball: This annual formal ball is hosted by the corps of cadets at a local hotel. All members of the school community — students, faculty, staff, alumni and parents — are invited. The event includes dinner and a guest speaker, usually a military officer of general officer rank or equivalent. The dress code mandates mess dress for cadets and all serving or retired military personnel with semi-formal evening dress or national costume for all other attendees. There was a long standing competition between senior female cadets to receive the honor of becoming queen of military ball. In 2019 this tradition ended making Trinity Coates Walker the last standing queen of military ball.
The Steptoe: This cheer in honor of Bishop Johnston is used at athletic events and on other occasions. It consists of the person cheering taking two exaggerated steps forward and motioning with a partially open hand to simulate the paw of a big cat, while shouting "Steptoe! Steptoe! Rah, rah, rah!".

Corps of Cadets

Approximately one third of TMI students are members of the corps of cadets. The TMI corps of cadets is under the command of MAJ Joseph Claburn (USA, Ret.), who has been the commandant of cadets since the beginning of the 2019-2020 school year, MSG Chad Gooding (USA, Ret.), and SGT Ray Purifoy (USA, Ret.), and is affiliated with the United States Army's Junior Reserve Officers' Training Corps. The Panther Battalion has also been named as an Honor Unit with Distinction, the highest possible unit award for a school JROTC program, for over a decade. Due to its high ranking, TMI cadets can apply for places at United States Service academies without the congressional recommendation usually required.

The battalion is organized into three companies: Alpha, Bravo, and Charlie. Due to expansion in the 2014-2015 school year a fourth company, Delta, was briefly added, but as the amount of participants in the program fell, and the number of cadets not being enough to justify the existence of a four companies, it was removed before the start of the 2015-2016 school year.  Companies are completely organized by the students, with each company having a senior company commander and a junior first sergeant.  The companies are divided into two platoons, with two or three squads in each platoon. The Corps is run by a staff consisting entirely of junior and senior Cadets. It sponsors a bagpipe band, a color guard, a sabre guard, a drill team and a rifle team

Alumni

Academia and science

Robert M. Ayres, former Vice-Chancellor of the University of the South
Light Townsend Cummins, historian (did not graduate)
Cresson Kearny, inventor and expert on nuclear survival
Ray Keck (Class of 1965), president of Texas A&M International University in Laredo, Texas
David Scott, astronaut, pilot of the Gemini 8 and Apollo 9 space flights, commander of Apollo 15 and became the seventh person to walk on the Moon
Lewis Sorley, military historian

The arts
Justin Blanchard, actor (Broadway ("Journey's End"), television ("Law and Order:SVU") and film)
Dan Blocker, actor and producer, co-star of the Bonanza television series
Julian Onderdonk, painter, known for Texas landscapes, called the "Father of Texas Painting"
"Wammo", DJ, beat poet and lead vocalist for the Asylum Street Spankers

Business and Ranching
John B. Armstrong, manager of the King Ranch
James A. Baker Jr., partner of the law firm Baker Botts; father of James Baker
Sam Barshop, founder of La Quinta Inns and philanthropist (Barshop Institute and the Barshop Jewish Community Center of San Antonio)
Tom Frost, banker and philanthropist, senior chairman of the boards of Frost National Bank in San Antonio and Cullen/Frost Bankers
Charles Schreiner, III, rancher from Kerr County who helped to preserve and expand herds of Texas Longhorn cattle

The Church
Robert R. Brown, 9th Bishop of Arkansas, author of "And One Was a Soldier": The Spiritual Pilgrimage of Robert E. Lee (1998)
Frank Juhan, Bishop of Florida, 1924–1956, and inductee of the College Football Hall of Fame (a Sewanee player)

Government and politics
 Jeremy Bernard, gay rights activist and the first man to serve as White House Social Secretary, appointed Feb. 25, 2011 by President Barack Obama 
 Henry E. Catto Jr., sometime US Ambassador to the Court of St. James and to the Republic of El Salvador, Vice-Chairman of the Aspen Institute
 Maury Maverick Jr., attorney, Texas state legislator and longtime columnist for the San Antonio Express-News
 George Berham Parr, the 'Duke of Duval County', South Texas political boss. 
 US Rep. Lamar S. Smith, representing the 21st Congressional District from 1987–present
 Milton H. West, seven-term Democratic member of the United States House of Representatives (1933–48)
 Bob Wheeler, member of Texas House of Representatives

Military
 Horace Clyde Balsley, pilot of the Lafayette Escadrille, recipient of the Croix de guerre and the Médaille militaire
 Lt General John B. Coulter,  Assistant Secretary-General of the United Nations 1953-58
 Lt General (retired) Robert Gard, Chairman of the Center for Arms Control and Non-Proliferation
 General Ralph E. Haines Jr., Vice Chief of Staff of the United States Army; commander of United States Army Pacific
 General of the Army Douglas MacArthur, Supreme Commander of the Allied Powers etc., recipient of the Medal of Honor
 Lt General (retired) Michael L. Oates, former Commanding General of the 10th Mountain Division
Brigadier General John L. Pierce, holder of various armored commands in the Second World War.

Recipients of the Distinguished Service Cross
 Lieutenant James Siman, class of 1912
 Captain Tobin Rote, class of 1913
 Major Edgar Tobin, class of 1914, first World War air ace, pioneer of aerial mapping
 Brigadier General David Lee "Tex" Hill, class of 1932, air-ace, member of Flying Tigers

Sport
Sherry Blakley, NASCAR driver
Ross Youngs, Hall of Fame professional baseball player
Pato O'Ward IndyCar driver

Notable faculty members
Frederick Ahl — Latin and prize-winning translator of Vergil, now Stephen H. Weiss Presidential Fellow at Cornell University
Page Morris - Mathematics
Josef R. Sheetz — Interim Headmaster in 1954

History of the School Name
 1893 - West Texas Military Academy (WTMA)
 1926 - Texas Military Institute (WTMA merged with the upper school of San Antonio Academy and the school was renamed Texas Military Institute)
 2004 - TMI – The Episcopal School of Texas 
 2017 - TMI Episcopal (adopted in November 2017)

See also 

 Marine Military Academy
 Peacock Military Academy

References

External links
TMI website
TMI on Twitter
TMI on Flickr
TMI Tube website where Residential Life students discuss their experience
TMI on YouTube
TMI on Vimeo

1893 establishments in Texas
Private boarding schools in Texas
Co-educational boarding schools
Episcopal Church in Texas
Educational institutions established in 1893
Episcopal schools in the United States
High schools in San Antonio
Independent Schools Association of the Southwest
Private high schools in Texas
Military schools in Texas